The 1992–93 Eliteserien season was the 36th season of the Eliteserien, the top ice hockey league in Denmark. Ten teams participated in the league, and Esbjerg IK won the championship. Gladsaxe SF was relegated to the 1. division.

First round

Final round

Playoffs

External links
 Season eliteprospects.com
 Season on hockeyarchives.info

Dan
1992-93
1992 in Danish sport
1993 in Danish sport